Eshaqabad (also Romanized as Esḩāqābād; also known as Eshagh Abad) is a village in Saadatabad Rural District, Pariz District, Sirjan County, Kerman Province, Iran. At the 2006 census, its population was 150, in 36 families.

References 

Populated places in Sirjan County